Mostafa Momeni (1940 – March 4, 2017) was an Iranian geographer and professor at Shahid Beheshti University.

Education and career 
Momeni was a doctoral student at the University of Marburg (1976).

He was selected for the 18th edition of the Book of the Year in Iran for writing the book Database of Geography in Iran: Database of Urban Geography in Iran. In addition to numerous research projects, more than 30 scientific articles in various fields of geography have been published and published in prestigious domestic and foreign journals. Mostafa Momeni's research has been done in the fields of urban geography, worldview, cultural geography, especially the effects of religion and ideology on the living space.

Works 
 Tehran: Geography, History, Culture, Seyed Hossein Nasr, Ali Ashraf Sadeghi, Mostafa Momeni and Farzaneh Sasanpour, Tehran: Reference Book
 Geography Database in Iran: Urban Geography Database in Iran, Mostafa Momeni, Tehran: Academy of Sciences of the Islamic Republic of Iran, 2000
 Jahan-e-Islam, Mostafa Momeni, Tehran: Reference book
 Tabriz: Geography, History, Mostafa Momeni, Tehran: Reference book
 Geography (pre-university course in humanities), authors group, Tehran: school

References 

1940 births
2017 deaths
Iranian geographers
People from Tehran